"Zero Hour: Crisis in Time!" is a comic book crossover storyline published by DC Comics in 1994, consisting of an eponymous five-issue limited series and a number of tie-in books. 

In the storyline, Hal Jordan, a member of the intergalactic police force known as the Green Lantern Corps, goes mad with grief after the destruction of his home town of Coast City during the "Reign of the Supermen!" storyline and attempts to destroy and remake the DC Universe after having obtained immense power as Parallax. The issues of the limited series were numbered in reverse order, beginning with issue #4 and ending with #0. The crossover involved almost every DC Universe monthly series published at the time.

Background
Zero Hour: Crisis in Time! was the follow-up to the Crisis on Infinite Earths limited series. This event served as an opportunity to reconcile continuity problems left unaddressed by Crisis and other problems that had been unintentionally caused by it. In particular, the revised characters of the post-Crisis universe had been rolled out gradually, with DC continuing to feature the old versions until the new versions were launched.

Plot

The story begins when characters from alternate realities such as Alpha Centurion, an alternate version of Batgirl, and Triumph suddenly start appearing in the DC Universe. A wave of entropy then moves from the end of time to the beginning, erasing entire historical ages in the process.

The villain of the story is Extant, formerly Hawk of the duo Hawk and Dove. Extant has acquired temporal powers, using them to unravel the DC Universe's timeline. In a confrontation with the Justice Society of America, Extant ages several of them — removing the effect that has kept them young from the 1940s into the present day — leaving them either feeble or dead. However, the true villain behind the destruction of the universe turns out to be Hal Jordan, a member of the Green Lantern Corps. Calling himself Parallax, Jordan has gone insane and is now trying to remake the universe, undoing the events which have caused his breakdown and his own murderous actions following it. The collective efforts of the other superheroes manage to stop Parallax from creating his vision of a new universe, and the timeline is recreated anew, albeit with subtle differences compared to the previous one, after the young hero Damage, with help from the other heroes, triggers a new Big Bang. Although Jordan was severely weakened from using so much energy, he manages to survive even after Green Arrow shoots an arrow into his heart.

Aftermath
DC published a fold-out timeline inside the back cover of Zero Hour #0 which identified various events and key stories and when they occurred. Although fixed dates were given for the debut of historical characters such as the JSA, the debut of Superman was presented as "10 years ago" and subsequent dates were expressed the same way, keeping the calendar years of these events fluid and relative to the present as a way to keep the characters at their present ages.

The Legion of Super-Heroes was completely rebooted following Zero Hour, and the various Hawkman characters were merged into one. Each ongoing series at the time retold the origin of its heroes in a #0 issue published after the end of Zero Hour and resumed their previous numbering the following month or went on to #1.

Tie-in issues
Action Comics #703
The Adventures of Superman #516
Anima #7
Batman #511
Batman: Shadow of the Bat #31
Catwoman (vol. 2) #14
Damage #6
Darkstars #24
Detective Comics #678
Flash (vol. 3) #94
Green Arrow (vol. 2) #90
Green Lantern (vol. 3) #55
Guy Gardner: Warrior #24
Hawkman (vol. 3) #13
Justice League America #92
Justice League International (vol. 2) #68
Justice League Task Force #16
L.E.G.I.O.N. '94 #70
Legion of Super-Heroes (vol. 4) #61
Legionnaires #18
Outsiders (vol. 2) #11
Robin (vol. 4) #10
Showcase '94 #8-10 (prelude)
Steel (vol. 2) #8
Superboy (vol. 3) #8
Superman (vol. 2) #93
Superman: The Man of Steel #37
Team Titans #24
Valor #23
Comics Values Monthly #95
Zero Hour Sampler
Zero Hour: Crisis in Time Ashcan Edition
Zero: The Beginning of Tomorrow

Series ending with Zero Hour
Team Titans (a spin-off of The New Titans)
L.E.G.I.O.N. '94
Valor
Justice League International (vol. 2)

Series rebooted during Zero Hour
Legion of Super-Heroes (vol. 4) and Legionnaires (after Zero Hour, both titles were treated as one bi-weekly series, much like the Superman books at the time)

Series launched following Zero Hour
Extreme Justice
Fate
R.E.B.E.L.S. '94 (replacement for L.E.G.I.O.N. '94)
Manhunter
Primal Force
Starman (vol. 2)
Xenobrood (miniseries)

Zero Month
Following the end of Zero Hour, every DC Universe title published a #0 issue retelling the character or team's origins and featured the slogan "The Beginning of Tomorrow!" in an event dubbed "Zero Month".
Batman #0
Deathstroke the Hunted #0
Flash (vol. 3) #0
Legion of Super-Heroes (vol. 4) #0
Primal Force #0
The Spectre (vol. 3) #0
Superboy (vol. 3) #0
Superman: The Man of Steel #0
Wonder Woman (vol. 2) #0
Batman: Shadow of the Bat #0
The Demon (vol. 3) #0
Green Lantern (vol. 3) #0
Hawkman (vol. 3) #0
Justice League America #0
The New Titans #0
Starman (vol. 2) #0
Superman (vol. 2) #0
The Adventures of Superman #0
Batman: Legends of the Dark Knight #0
Detective Comics #0
Fate #0
Gunfire #0
Justice League Task Force #0
Legionnaires #0
Outsiders (vol. 2) #0
The Ray (vol. 2) #0
R.E.B.E.L.S.'94 #0
Steel (vol. 2) #0
Xenobrood #0
Action Comics #0
Anima #0
Aquaman #0
Catwoman (vol. 2) #0
Damage #0
The Darkstars #0
Green Arrow (vol. 2) #0
Guy Gardner, Warrior #0
Lobo #0
Manhunter #0
Robin (vol. 4) #0

Booster Gold #0 (2008)
In 2008, 14 years after the end of Zero Hour, an issue of Booster Gold (vol. 2) was published as "Booster Gold #0", and was announced as an official Zero Hour tie-in by DC Comics. The issue used the same cover style as the previous tie-ins to the event, referring to the "Crisis in Time" and using the semi-metallic "fifth color" ink used on the original Zero Hour issues. Like the other tie-in issues, Booster's origin was explained as part of the adventure in the issue. The cover was a homage to Zero Hour #4, with Ted Kord's mask replacing Wally West's, alternate Blue Beetles replacing the alternate Hawkmen and the superheroes around the edges replaced by Booster in the center.

In other media

Some elements of Zero Hour: Crisis in Time storyline were loosely adapted into Green Lantern: Beware My Power as part of the Tomorrowverse

Collected editions

References

External links
The Annotated DC Project: Zero Hour: Crisis in Time!
Superman Homepage: The Zero Hour FAQ (Version 3.11, February 2006)
Alternity
Zero Hour at the DC Database Project

1994 comics debuts
Comic book reboots
Comics about parallel universes
Comics about the end of the universe
Comics about time travel
Comics by Dan Jurgens
Crossover comics
DC Comics limited series
DC Comics titles
Green Lantern storylines